Chinese given names are the given names adopted by speakers of the Chinese language, both in majority-Sinophone countries and among the Chinese diaspora.

Description
Chinese given names are almost always made up of one or - usually - two characters and are written after the surname. Therefore, Wei of the Zhang family is called "Zhang Wei" and not "Wei Zhang". In contrast to the relative paucity of Chinese surnames, given names can theoretically include any of the Chinese language's 100,000 characters and contain almost any meaning.

It is considered disrespectful in China to name a child after an older relative, and both bad practice and disadvantageous for the child's fortune to copy the names of celebrities or famous historical figures. A common name like "Liu Xiang" might be possessed by tens of thousands of people, but generally they were not named for the athlete. An even stronger naming taboo was current during the time of the Chinese Empire, when other bearers of the emperor's name could be gravely punished for not having changed their name upon his ascension. Similarly, it is quite rare to see Chinese children bear the same name as their fathersthe closest examples typically include small differences, such as the former Premier Li Peng's son, who is named Li Xiaopeng.

Since the Three Kingdoms era, some families have had generation names worked out long in advance, and all members (or all male members) of a generation have the same first character in their two-character given names. In other families there is a small number of generational names which are cycled through. Together, these generation names may be a poem about the hope or history of the family. This tradition has largely fallen into abeyance since the Communist victory in the Civil War; the "Tse" in Mao Tse-tung was the fourteenth generation of such a cycle, but he chose to ignore his family's generational poem to name his own sons. A similar practice was observed regarding the stage names of Chinese opera performers: all the students entering a training academy in the same year would adopt the same first character in their new "given name". For example, as part of the class entering the National Drama School in 1933, Li Yuru adopted a name with the central character "jade".

There are also other conventions. It is frequently the case that children are given names based on gender stereotypes, with boys acquiring 'masculine' names implying strength or courage while girls receive 'feminine' names concerning beauty or flowers. Since doubled characters are considered diminutives in Chinese, many girls also receive names including a doubled pair of characters or two characters with identical pronunciation. A famous exception to this generally feminine practice is Yo-Yo Ma.

Apart from generational names, siblings' names are frequently related in other ways as well. For example, one son's name may include a character meaning "Sun" ( or ) while his sister would have the character for "Moon" or a character including the moon radical. It is also common to split modern Chinese wordswhich now usually consist of two characters of similar meaning both to each other and the full wordamong a pair of children, such as Jiankang ("healthy") appearing in the children's names as -jian ("strong") and -kang ("healthy").

Chinese personal names can also reflect periods of history. For example, many Chinese born during the Cultural Revolution have "revolutionary names" such as Qiangguo (lit. "Strong Country" or "Strengthening the Country") or Dongfeng (lit. "Eastern Wind"). In Taiwan, it was formerly common to incorporate one of the four characters of the name "Republic of China" (Zhōnghuá Mínguó) into masculine names. Patriotic names remain common but are becoming less popular960,000 Chinese are currently named Jianguo (lit. "Building the Country") but only a few thousand more are now being added each year.

Within families, adults rarely refer to each other by personal names. Adult relatives and children referring to adults generally use a family title such as "Big Sister", "Second Sister", "Third Sister", and so on. It is considered rude for a child to refer to parents by their given name, and this taboo is extended to all adult relatives.

When speaking of non-family social acquaintances, people are generally referred to by a titlefor example, "Mister Zhang", "Mother Li" or "Chu's Wife". Personal names are used when referring to adult friends or to children and are typically spoken completely; if the given name is two characters long, it is almost never truncated. Another common way to reference someone in a friendly way is to call them "Old" (Lǎo) or "Little" (xiǎo) along with their surname.

Many people have a non-Chinese name (typically English) in addition to their Chinese names. For example, the Taiwanese politician Soong Chu-yu is also known as "James Soong". In the case of Christians, their Western names are often their baptismal names. In Hong Kong, it is common to list the names all together, beginning with the English given name, moving on to the Chinese surname, and then ending with the Chinese given namefor example, Alex Fong Chung-Sun. Among American-born and other overseas Chinese it is common practice to be referred to primarily by one's non-Chinese name, with the Chinese one relegated to alternate or middle name status. Recent immigrants, however, often use their Chinese name as their legal name and adopt a non-Chinese name for casual use only.

Proper use of pinyin romanization means treating a Chinese given name as a single word with no space between the letters of the two characters: for example, the common name 王秀英 is properly rendered either with its tone marks as Wáng Xiùyīng or without as Wang Xiuying, but should not be written as Wang Xiu Ying, Wang XiuYing, Wangxiuying, &c. The earlier Wade-Giles system accomplished the same effect by hyphenating the given name between the characters: for example, the same name would be written as Wang2 Hsiù4-Yīng1. However, many Chinese do not follow these rules, romanizing their names with a space between each. This can cause non–Chinese-speakers to incorrectly take the names as divisible.

In regions where fortune-telling is more popular, many parents may name their children on the advice of literomancers.  The advice are often given based on the number of strokes of the names or the perceived elemental value of the characters in relation to the child's birth time and personal elemental value; rarely on the sound of the name as there is no system of fortune-telling based on character pronunciations.  In jurisdictions where it is possible, people may also choose to change their legal given name, or their children's names, in order to improve their fortune.

Common Chinese names
As of 2007, the most common names in China were:

See also
 Art name
 Chinese clan name
 Chinese nickname
 Chinese surname
 Courtesy name
 Generation name
 Japanese name
 Korean name
 Milk name
 Naming taboo
 Onomastics
 Posthumous name
 Russian name
 School name
 Temple name
 Vietnamese name

Footnotes

References

External links
Some western names written in Chinese characters
Scholar urges resuming traditional names
Top 20 Mostly Used Given Names in China